Michelle Smith de Bruin (born 16 December 1969 in Rathcoole) is an Irish lawyer and retired Olympic swimmer. She won three gold medals at the 1996 Summer Olympics in Atlanta, for the 400 m individual medley, 400 m freestyle and 200 m individual medley, and also won the bronze medal for the 200 m butterfly event. Smith's wins in Atlanta were marked by allegations of doping, which were never proven. Smith was banned for four years by FINA, the international swimming federation, for manipulation of an anti-doping sample, a decision upheld by the Court of Arbitration for Sport when Smith appealed. Smith never returned to competitive swimming and later worked as a barrister, practising under her married name of Michelle de Bruin.

Swimming career

Michelle Smith's father taught his daughters how to swim, and Smith was first spotted by a lifeguard in Tallaght swimming pool at age nine. He suggested that Smith's father enroll his daughter in a swimming club. Smith joined Terenure Swimming Club and trained under the tutelage of Larry Williamson. Smith won the Dublin and All-Ireland Community Games at aged 9. She won ten gold medals at a novice competition. She enrolled in the King's Hospital Swimming Club in 1980. At aged 14, Smith won ten medals at the Irish National Swimming Championships. At 14, she became National Junior and Senior Champion and dominated Irish women's swimming until her retirement in 1998.

Smith first appeared on the world scene as an 18-year-old at the Seoul Olympics and narrowly missed the B-final in the 200 m backstroke (top 16). Smith's second major championship was at the 1991 World Championships in Perth, Australia, where she finished 13th in the 400 m individual medley. She competed at the 1991 European Championships and qualified for the 1992 Olympic Games. She competed in the 200 m medley and backstroke and 400 m medley in the 1992 Olympics in Barcelona, Spain, despite suffering an injury in the months leading up to the Games. She finished fifth in the 200 m butterfly at the 1994 World Championships. In that same year, she suffered from glandular fever, which affected her training prior to the World Championships.

In 1995, Smith set Irish records in 50 m, 100 m, 400 m and 800 m freestyle, 100 m backstroke, 100 m and 200 m butterfly, and 200 m and 400 m medley events. She was ranked number 1 in 200 m butterfly, sixth in 100 m butterfly and seventh in 200 m medley; she made sporting history by becoming the first Irishwoman to win a European title in 200 m butterfly and the individual 400 m medley in the same year.

1996 Olympics
Smith won three gold medals and a bronze medal in Atlanta. There was controversy at the Games due to Smith qualifying for the 400m freestyle event at the expense of the then-world record holder Janet Evans, who had finished ninth in the preliminary swims with only the top eight advancing. Smith did not submit her qualifying time for the 400m freestyle event before the 5 July deadline but did so two days later with the Irish Olympic officials insisting they had been given permission to submit the qualifying time after the deadline. Smith applied for the event after she had arrived in Atlanta. After Smith qualified at the expense of Evans, the US Swimming Federation, supported by the German and Netherlands swimming teams, challenged a decision to allow Smith to compete but were unsuccessful. At a later conference, Evans highlighted that accusations of Smith doping had been heard by her poolside. Smith later received an apology from Evans.

Sample tampering ban
Two years after the 1996 Summer Olympics, FINA banned Smith for four years for tampering with her urine sample using alcohol. She appealed the decision to the Court of Arbitration for Sport (CAS). Her case was heard by a panel of three sport lawyers, including Michael Beloff QC. Unusually for a CAS hearing, Smith's case was heard in public, at her own lawyer's request. FINA submitted evidence from Jordi Segura, head of the IOC-accredited laboratory in Barcelona, that said she took androstenedione, a metabolic precursor of testosterone, in the previous 10-to-12 hours before being tested. Smith denied this and androstenedione was not a banned substance. The International Olympic Committee banned androstenedione and placed it under the category of androgenic-anabolic steroids in 1997.The CAS upheld the ban.

She was 28 at the time, and the ban effectively ended her competitive swimming career. Smith was not stripped of her Olympic medals, as she had never tested positive for any banned substances.

Her coach and husband, Erik De Bruin, previously served a four-year ban for using illegal drugs during his career as a discus thrower.

Legal career
During Smith's experience at CAS, she developed an interest in the law. After officially announcing her retirement from swimming in 1999, she returned to university, graduating from University College Dublin with a degree in law. In July 2005 she was conferred with the degree of Barrister at Law of King's Inns, Dublin. While a student at the King's Inns she won the internal Brian Walsh Moot Court competition. Her book, Transnational Litigation: Jurisdiction and Procedure was published in 2008 by Thomson Round Hall.

Smith is an expert in private international law, the recognition and enforcement of foreign judgments, EU law and the law applicable to disputes following Brexit.

In 2007, Smith appeared on Celebrities Go Wild, an RTÉ reality television show in which eight celebrities had to fend for themselves in the wilds of rural Connemara.

Smith has always denied using illegal performance-enhancing drugs. In 1996, she released her autobiography, Gold, co-written with Cathal Dervan.

Personal life
In 1993 Smith began training with Dutch discus thrower Erik de Bruin, whom she had met in Barcelona. They married in 1996. Smith lives in Kells, County Kilkenny with de Bruin and their two children.

Legacy
Smith remains Ireland's most successful Olympian, male or female. She holds Irish records for the 200m and 400m freestyle, 200m butterfly, and 400m individual medley (long course). She also holds the Irish record in the 400m individual medley (short course).

Katie Taylor's gold medal in boxing in 2012 was Ireland's first gold since Smith's three in 1996.

See also
List of multiple Olympic gold medalists at a single Games
List of sportspeople sanctioned for doping offences

References

External links
Irish Law Library profile
Transnational Litigation: Jurisdiction and Procedure (Smith deBruin's book)

1969 births
Living people
Female butterfly swimmers
Irish female freestyle swimmers
Female medley swimmers
Doping cases in swimming
Irish sportspeople in doping cases
Olympic bronze medalists for Ireland
Olympic gold medalists for Ireland
Olympic bronze medalists in swimming
Olympic swimmers of Ireland
Participants in Irish reality television series
Sportspeople from County Dublin
Swimmers at the 1988 Summer Olympics
Swimmers at the 1992 Summer Olympics
Swimmers at the 1996 Summer Olympics
European Aquatics Championships medalists in swimming
Medalists at the 1996 Summer Olympics
Irish female swimmers
Olympic gold medalists in swimming
RTÉ Sports Person of the Year winners
Irish barristers
Alumni of King's Inns
People from Rathcoole, County Dublin
Sportspeople from South Dublin (county)